David Joseph Frisch, Jr. (born June 22, 1970) is a former American football tight end in the National Football League.

Frisch was born to David and Janet (Wecker) Frisch.  He attended Northwest High School in Cedar Hill, Missouri.  After high school, he played college football at Iowa Central Community College, the University of Missouri and Colorado State University.

He played with the Cincinnati Bengals as a tight-end from 1993 to 1995.  Frisch was with the New England Patriots for a year in 1995 and then played with the Minnesota Vikings.  He ended his career after a few years with the Washington Redskins.

Frisch is a descendant of Rev. Martin Boehm and Lt. John Gibbs.

External links
 Playing Stats 1993-1997
 1996 Game Data

1970 births
Living people
People from St. Louis County, Missouri
Players of American football from Missouri
American football tight ends
Missouri Tigers football players
Colorado State Rams football players
Cincinnati Bengals players
New England Patriots players
Minnesota Vikings players
Washington Redskins players
Iowa Central Tritons football players